Carnota is a municipality of northwestern Spain in the province of A Coruña, autonomous community of Galicia. It belongs to the comarca of Muros. It has an area of 66.4 km2, a population of 5,285 (2004 estimate) and a population density of 79.59 people/km2 It is famous because of its majestic hórreo, granary, the largest one in the world. It has a Barrocan style and is dated back to 1768. Carnota is also very famous for its more than 7 km long beach, the longest in all of Galicia, and Mount Pindo.

Its name could come from the pre-Celtic word of "carn", which means stone.

Limits 
The municipality of Carnota borders on the north with the municipality of Dumbría, the northwest with Mazaricos, the west by the Atlantic, and south Muros. It includes various small villages such as O Pindo, Quilmas, A Curra, Panches, Caldebarcos, Vadebois, San Cibran, Vilar de Parada, Fetos, Louredo O viso, Pedrafigueria, Sofan, Mallou, Carballal, Lira, and several more.

History 
There tombs and forts indicating that the area has been inhabited since antiquity. In the Middle Ages it belonged to the Counts of Trastámara and Lemos and was part of the old county of Cornatum. With the Great Irmandiña War of 1467 disappeared strengths. The location of the capital, Carnota, originated in the 17th century. In the 19th century, it was sacked by the French in the War of Spanish Independence.

References

Municipalities in the Province of A Coruña